Avenues Television is a 24-hour news channel in Nepal. It is a free to air satellite channel, and is available in 56 countries. 

ATV had started its transmission on July 16, 2007. Avenues Television has established a unique and informal way of news delivery in Nepal. Giving priority to nationality, democracy and human rights Avenues television has dug-out many issues throughout the country and abroad. This is a trend settler television in Nepalese television history as all of the emerging channels are following the pattern established by ATV.

Avenues Television has always given priority to the voice of the voiceless. It is a 24-hour news channel that gives top priority to the delivery of the news as fast as possible in a reliable way. Avenues Television has gathered mounting popularity within a short span of time because of its style in news and views presentation. Timely research shows that Avenues Television has a constant TRP rate far better than other competitive TV channels.

Avenues Television has been awarded for various social campaigns in favor of disadvantaged and marginalized people. Fund collecting for disaster victims and disadvantageous people has been its trend from the very beginning. It believes not only in issues/problems raising but also in finding out solutions on a local and national level. Avenues Television has been with people for pressuring the leaders for the meaningful end of peace process and formation of a new Constitution of Nepal.

Major Programs and Packages

Khabar Bhitrako Khabar (news inside the news): This is the logo program of Avenues Television. “Khabar Bhitrako Khabar” (Inside the story with in-depth analysis) is the most popular program broadcast on Avenues Television every day from 8 pm to 8:40 pm. It covers various issues covering social, political, educational, economic, and environmental issues concerning the people and nation.
 Off The Beat:  As its name suggests this is a bit of a satirical program. It is designed to attack stakeholders for their wrongdoing. It is based on simple language in the script. The use of slang and a common view to major issues are presented in a satirical way. It is like a Television editorial, a new trend in TV journalism. In the line of logic, it criticizes, appreciates, suggests, and tries to give the way as per the necessity at 8.40 to 9.20 pm.
 Deshma Aaja (today in the country): This is a daily package as a step to prioritize the news beyond the capital city. Most of the happenings across the country beyond the capital are covered in this program at 6.30 pm.
 Nine News: A bulletin package, with short analysis of nine selected prime news of the day at 9 pm.
 Business News: Business news package related at 9 am and 10 pm.
 Duniya Ko Khabar (News from around the World): This is a daily news package based on international news. This covers all the major political, social, and human interest issues from around the world.
 Hami Janata (We the People): It is a public hearing program live broadcast on Avenues Television on a weekly basis. This program is based on current and hot issues concerned to the people directly. In this live program, representatives stakeholders are called and the presenter of the program facilitates the audience to ask their questions.
 '''Hamilai Bhannu Chha (We have something to say): Next program based on public opinion and suggestions. In the program, the audience is requested to tell about their inconveniences and complaints through our TV.
 Nirnayak Bahas (Decisive Discussion): As Nepal has been suffering the never-ending political stalemate, Avenues television has taken initiative with TBN (Television Broadcasters Nepal) to end the political deadlock by offering a common forum for the main leaders of the country to minimize their differences. On the very first edition of the (public hearing type) program, Avenues TV had organized a program where the three top leaders of the three main parties of Nepal were invited to discuss with each other as well with the live audience.
 Avenues@crime: A weekly package program based on crime and investigation. It is based on an in-depth analysis of crime events, crime investigation progress, and dramatization of the events.
 Aparichit Yatra (Unknown Journey): A different program on television. It presents a well-known personality's unknown or sidelined talents. Basically, a popular personality for one thing with the next talent of equal importance is selected for the package.
 Sambidhan Sabhaka Kura (Talks of the Constituent Assembly): This is a weekly package program that focuses on the activities of constituent assembly's activities, meeting, and progress of drafting news constitution. This also pressurizes the constituent assembly member to make the constitution in time. Report, interview, and vox-pop are included in the program. This is one of our initiatives with people to pressurize the leaders to form a new constitution in time.
 Sambad (Dialogue): A talk show on current issues with relevant personalities.
 Power views: A panel discussion program based on social and political issues.
 Byakti Bishaya Ra Bisesh (Personality subject and Special): A daily morning talk show, on-air at 7:30 am, focusing on personality, issues, and specialties accordingly.
 Swor Bhitrako Manche (man inside the voice): Program dedicated to art and artists.
 Style ko Duniya (the world of style): A program that gives information about the latest fashion and style.
 Shasakti (Empowerment): This is a weekly package focusing on the woman rights and empowerment of the women.
 Sambodhan (Addressing): This weekly package highlights the unused potential of the Far-Western Region of Nepal.
 Avenues @ Health: A daily package based on health issues and events.
 Saskriti (Culture): This weekly program covers all the festivals and local cultural programs.
 Sports Arena: The weekly package covers national and international sport events and issues.
 Khabar Bisesh (Special News): This weekly package is based on the most discussed and influential issues and event of the week.

News bulletin

Besides the regular schedule, Avenues Television gives priority to live coverage and delivery of the news events fastest time possible. Spot discussion and public opinion on the breaking events with live coverage has been our regular trend.Schedule'''
Prime: 7:00 am, 2:00 pm and 7:00 pm
Hourly bulletin: 6am, 10am, 11am, 12pm, 1 pm, 4 pm, 5pm, 6pm, 11 pm, 1 am, 3am, 4am.

See also
List of Nepali television stations

References

External links 
 

Television news in Nepal
2007 establishments in Nepal